Tepelmeme Villa de Morelos is a town and municipality in Oaxaca in south-western Mexico.
It is part of the Coixtlahuaca District in the Mixteca Region. 

As of 2005, the municipality had a total population of 419.

References

Municipalities of Oaxaca